Tinagma mexicanum is a moth in the Douglasiidae family. It is found in Mexico, where it has been recorded from Baja California.

References

Moths described in 1990
Douglasiidae